Said-Ali Saidovich Akhmayev (born 30 May 1996) is a Russian football player. He plays for Khimki and Khimki-M.

Club career
He made his debut in the Russian Professional Football League for FC Chernomorets Novorossiysk on 28 July 2016 in a game against FC Dynamo Stavropol.

He made his Russian Premier League debut for FC Tambov on 10 April 2021 against FC Khimki.

Career statistics

References

External links
 
 
 Profile by Russian Professional Football League

1996 births
Footballers from Moscow
Living people
Russian footballers
Association football forwards
FC Spartak Moscow players
FC Rostov players
FC Chernomorets Novorossiysk players
Speranța Nisporeni players
FC Ararat Moscow players
FC Tambov players
FC Torpedo Vladimir players
FC SKA-Khabarovsk players
FC Khimki players
Russian Second League players
Moldovan Super Liga players
Russian Premier League players
Russian First League players
Russian expatriate footballers
Russian expatriate sportspeople in Moldova
Expatriate footballers in Moldova